"Ten Feet Tall" is a 2014 song by Afrojack featuring Wrabel.

Ten Feet Tall may also refer to:

Music
Ten Feet Tall and Bulletproof, American country artist Travis Tritt's fourth album

Songs
"Ten Feet Tall", 1970 single by Joe Gibbs (record producer)
"Ten Feet Tall", 1979 song by XTC the album Drums and Wires	
"Ten Feet Tall", 1990 song by Mark Lanegan from the album The Winding Sheet
"Ten Feet Tall", 1992 song by punk band Samiam from Billy
"Ten Feet Tall and Bulletproof" (song), title track from above album by Travis Tritt
"Ten Feet Tall", 1986 song by Eric Martin
"Ten Feet Tall (II)", 2015 song by Passion Pit from the album Kindred
"Ten Feet Tall", 2018 song by Cavetown from the album Lemon Boy

Other uses

Ten Feet Tall, a short film by Aaron Wilson (director)

See also
A Boy Ten Feet Tall, 1963 British film directed by Alexander Mackendrick
A Man Is Ten Feet Tall, a screenplay by Robert Alan Aurthur produced as the final episode of The Philco Television Playhouse
"A Man is Ten Feet Tall", 1956 song by Dick Williams
"Little Man...Ten Feet Tall", episode 34 of season 4 of Bonanza
"Love Makes You Feel Ten Feet Tall", 1970 song by The Velvet Underground from Loaded